The 2010 Pan American Youth Championship was the first edition of the Pan American Youth Championship, an international under–18 field hockey competition. The tournament was held in Hermosillo, Mexico, from 7–13 February.

The tournament also served as a direct qualifier for the 2010 Summer Youth Olympics.

Qualified teams

Umpires
The following umpires were appointed by the Pan American Hockey Federation to officiate the tournament:

Albert Marcano (TTO)
Arturo Vázquez (MEX)
Daniel Basto (MEX)
Gavin Caldecott (CAN)
Jamar Springer (BAR)
Javier Loza (ARG)
Lance Sarabia (USA)

Results

Preliminary round

Fixtures

Classification round

Third and fourth place

Final

Statistics

Final standings

Goalscorers

References

External links
Pan American Hockey Federation

Field hockey at the 2010 Summer Youth Olympics
International field hockey competitions hosted by Mexico
Pan American Youth Championship (boys' field hockey)